Songs of the Spires is the debut album by American new wave pop group Gleaming Spires. It features the single "Are You Ready for the Sex Girls?" and was produced by Stephen Hague.

History 

Gleaming Spires began as a side project of Leslie Bohem and David Kendrick. In 1980, they were enlisted as the bassist and drummer, respectively, for the art pop band Sparks, consisting of brothers Ron and Russell Mael. While in Sparks, Bohem and Kendrick convened with producer Stephen Hague to record a series of demos. The demo tape made its way to K-ROQ in Los Angeles, and according to Kendrick, when Posh Boy founder Robbie Fields heard the tape, he decided to release the songs as they were; the Songs of the Spires album consists of these demos.

While the Spires themselves originally did not want it released as a single, "Are You Ready for the Sex Girls?" went on to become the band's only hit. A music video was created for the song, featuring Bohem and Kendrick making coffee and baking a lemon meringue pie, as well as for "How to Get Girls Thru Hypnotism," featuring Bohem's head being shaved. For the former, Kendrick observed that "one could easily make the worst contrived, hackneyed, sexist, insulting, exploitative and ridiculous video in the world to 'Sex Girls,' so why not leave sex and girls out altogether[?] Some people got it I hope." "Sex Girls" later saw renewed popularity when it appeared in the 1984 film Revenge of the Nerds. Unlike the film the accompanying soundtrack album featured the later re-recording of the song. 

The tongue-in-cheek liner notes were written by the Mael brothers. Russell Mael praises the album's virtues despite "not personally [having had] the time to listen to [the album]", and Ron Mael facetiously calls it "the best Gleaming Spires album ... ever."

Release 
Songs of the Spires was originally released on vinyl in 1981 by Posh Boy Records. In 2015, the album was reissued on vinyl by Futurismo, and again in 2021 for CD and streaming by Omnivore Recordings.

Track listing

Personnel 
Credits adopted from the Songs of the Spires liner notes.
 Leslie Bohem - vocals, bass guitar, acoustic guitar, synthesizers
 David Kendrick - drums, percussion
 S.R. Jade - "vocal harangue" on "How to Get Girls Thru Hypnotism"
 Stephen Hague - producer
 The Bunker Ent. - graphics
 Kevin J. Walker - cover art illustration
 Russell Mael, Ron Mael - liner notes

References 

1981 debut albums
Gleaming Spires albums
Albums produced by Stephen Hague
Posh Boy Records albums